Vilathupatti  is a village in the Annavasalrevenue block of Pudukkottai district, Tamil Nadu, India.

Demographics 

As per the 2001 census, Vilathupatti had a total population of 4472 with 2139 males and 2333 females. Out of the total population 2821 people were literate.

References

Villages in Pudukkottai district